Blackpill (or Black Pill) is a suburban area of Swansea, Wales, beside Swansea Bay, about  southwest of the city centre.

Description 
Blackpill falls into the Mayals ward.

The area is centred on a seafront building on Mumbles road, which once served as a station and power station for the Swansea and Mumbles Railway; today, it houses a cafe called "The Junction". The land between Mumbles road and Blackpill beach is used as Blackpill Lido, a family and children's play area which is popular in summer. Also on Mumbles road is 'The Woodman', a local pub, and Blackpill Post Office.

Behind the Woodman, to the left of the main entrance to Clyne Gardens, is Clyne Chapel. The chapel was built in 1907 by Graham Vivian, who owned the nearby Clyne Castle and Estate, as the private chapel for his family. Although Vivian specified that it should have no stained glass windows to distract from the beauty of its surroundings, there are within it a range of notable artefacts that he collected on his tours to Italy. Clyne Chapel is a Grade II listed building and serves as the Anglican church for the local community.

The southern entrance to the Clyne valley cycle track is just across the road from the boating lake area. This cycle track runs through the Clyne Valley Country Park to Killay, Dunvant, and Gowerton, following the route of a former railway line, which formed the start of the Heart of Wales Line prior to the Beeching Axe of the 1960s.

Sloping uphill to the west of Blackpill are Clyne Gardens (Gerddi Clun), the landscaped former park of Clyne Castle. Built in the late 18th century and much altered, the building was for half a century a university hall, but is now converted to flats. Replacing demolished 20th-century student accommodation blocks is a new estate of luxury futuristic houses built by Holder Mathias Architects, which were nominated for a RIBA award.

A Territorial Army barracks is just off the Mumbles Road leading up to West Cross.

Leisure

Blackpill has leisure facilities such as a former boating lake, which was here for about thirty years and has now been converted into a shallow paddling pool. North of the boating lake was a mini golf course sandwiched between a carriageway and cycle track. Blackpill Pitch-and-Putt, despite its name, is actually within the Sketty electoral ward, and in 2016 was converted to a footgolf course.

Blackpill Beach
Blackpill Beach is an area known for wildlife and wildlife watchers. Large numbers of wading birds and a variety of gulls, some rare, gather here at high tide. The beach and the stream that flows out of the area is a designated Site of Special Scientific Interest.

Plans
The local council has plans to improve the leisure facilities in the area. Proposals include a new visitor centre for bird watchers at the mouth of the Blackpill Stream, additional car parking, upgrades to the Blackpill Lido to create a children's water park, a cycle hire centre, and improvements to the waterfront skate park.

A new foot- and cycle-bridge has been proposed, crossing over the dual carriageway, to connect the waterfront promenade to the cycle track in the Clyne Valley. A fourth park and ride site for Swansea is planned to be located at the existing car park at the entrance to the Clyne Valley Country Park. This new park-and-ride facility would serve both Mumbles and the city centre.

References

External links
BBC South West Wales: Blackpill Dunes
BBC South West Wales: Blackpill Lido
 “A Stroll Through The History of Blackpill”

 Time-Lapse video of high tide at Blackpill Beach
 “The Old Blackpill School” by A History of Mumbles
 “How Old is the Roman Bridge at Blackpill?” by A History of Mumbles

Districts of Swansea
Sites of Special Scientific Interest in West Glamorgan
Mumbles
Swansea Bay